Lovrenc na Pohorju (or Sankt Lorenzen ob Marburg) is a settlement in northeastern Slovenia. It lies in the Pohorje Hills to the west of Maribor. The area is part of the traditional region of Styria. It is now included in the Drava Statistical Region. It is the seat of the Municipality of Lovrenc na Pohorju.

Name
The name of the settlement was changed from Sveti Lovrenc na Pohorju (literally, 'Saint Lawrence on Pohorje') to Lovrenc na Pohorju (literally, 'Lawrence on Pohorje') in 1952. The name was changed on the basis of the 1948 Law on Names of Settlements and Designations of Squares, Streets, and Buildings as part of efforts by Slovenia's postwar communist government to remove religious elements from toponyms.

Churches
The parish church from which the settlement gets its name is dedicated to Saint Lawrence and belongs to the Roman Catholic Archdiocese of Maribor. It was first mentioned in written documents dating to the 12th century. It was rebuilt in 1407 and extensively remodeled in the 18th century. Two other churches in the settlement are dedicated to Saint Radegund and to the Holy Cross. Both date to the 17th century.

A community of Jehovah's Witnesses has also been living in Lovrenc na Pohorju since at least the 1970s and built a Kingdom Hall around 2000.

References

External links
 
 Lovrenc na Pohorju on Geopedia
 Lovrenc na Pohorju municipal site

Populated places in the Municipality of Lovrenc na Pohorju